Bicentennial Nigger is the sixth album by the American comedian Richard Pryor. David Banks produced the album, while Warner Bros. Records released the album in September 1976. It is often considered one of his most influential recordings. The CD version of the album was released on 20 June 1989. It won the 1977 Grammy Award for Best Comedy Album.

The album was recorded in July 1976 at the Roxy Theatre in West Hollywood, with the exception of the title track, recorded at The Comedy Store in Hollywood in February 1976, location recording by Wally Heider Recording, engineer Biff Dawes. Album cover design and art direction by Kosh.

It ends with the words "I ain't never goin' to forget".

Track listing 
Side one
 "Hillbilly" - 2:15
 "Black and White Women" - 4:06
 "Our Gang" - 2:48
 "Bicentennial Prayer" - 6:42
Side two
 "Black Hollywood" - 5:25
 "Mudbone Goes to Hollywood" - 10:11
 "Chinese Restaurant" - 1:18
 "Acid" - 4:55
 "Bicentennial Nigger" - 2:25

 On cassette releases, "Acid" was moved to side one, after "Bicentennial Prayer," to make the content more even on each side of the tape.

References

External links 
 Richard Pryor's Official Homepage

Richard Pryor live albums
Stand-up comedy albums
1976 live albums
Warner Records live albums
Grammy Award for Best Comedy Album
1970s comedy albums
United States Bicentennial
Albums recorded at the Roxy Theatre